Pennsylvania Highlands Community College is a public community college in Johnstown, Pennsylvania. Satellite sites are provided in Altoona (Blair County), Ebensburg (northern Cambria County), Somerset (Somerset County), and Huntingdon (Huntingdon County).

Admissions
Pennsylvania Highlands Community College grants admissions to individuals who have successfully earned a high school diploma or a GED high school equivalency. Standardized tests such as SAT's are not required.  Pennsylvania Highlands accepts applications year round and admits students on a rolling basis.

Academics
The college offers Associate degrees, diploma programs, and certificate programs. It is accredited by the Middle States Commission on Higher Education.

References

External links
Official website

Two-year colleges in the United States
Community colleges in Pennsylvania
Educational institutions established in 1994
Universities and colleges in Cambria County, Pennsylvania
1994 establishments in Pennsylvania